Vålberg is a locality situated in Karlstad Municipality, Värmland County, Sweden with 2,770 inhabitants in 2010.

References 

Populated places in Värmland County
Populated places in Karlstad Municipality